is a Japanese footballer who plays for SC Sagamihara.

National team career
In June 2005, Hyodo was elected Japan U-20 national team for 2005 World Youth Championship. At this tournament, he wore the number 10 shirt for Japan and played all 4 matches.

Club statistics
Updated to 18 February 2019.

1Includes Japanese Super Cup.

Honours
Yokohama F. Marinos
Emperor's Cup: 2013

References

External links

Profile at Yokohama F. Marinos 
Profile at Hokkaido Consadole Sapporo

1985 births
Living people
Waseda University alumni
Association football people from Nagasaki Prefecture
Japanese footballers
Japan youth international footballers
J1 League players
J2 League players
Yokohama F. Marinos players
Hokkaido Consadole Sapporo players
Vegalta Sendai players
SC Sagamihara players
Association football midfielders